The Charlotte 49ers football program represents the University of North Carolina at Charlotte in college football. The UNC Charlotte Board of Trustees officially voted to add a football program on November 13, 2008, after a unanimous recommendation by the Football Feasibility Committee. It was made possible by Student Government initiatives starting in 2006 by then-student body president Benjamin Comstock and student body vice president Jordan Van Dyne, namely the first step of organizing a transparent student vote on football that disclosed possible hikes in tuition fees as a result of football. The online poll was approved by the Student Senate and administered in collaboration with the University's IT Department. Despite the possibility of potential rises in student fees, the vote clearly displayed a student interest in a football team. The program began play during the 2013 NCAA Division I FCS football season.

History

Origins
In 1946, 22 young men began practice as the Charlotte Center of the University of North Carolina Owl's first athletic program: a football team. The team finished the season 2–4, with wins over Pembroke State and Belmont Abbey, and losses to Davidson JV, Catawba College JV, and Clemson's "B" team. The team hosted 2 home games that year at American Legion Memorial Stadium. In part due to the effects of fewer  World War II veterans entering college in the late 1940s, the football program ended after the 1948 season. The final football game was played on October 27, 1948.

On July 12, 2006, a group of 15 UNC Charlotte students and alumni held the inaugural Charlotte 49er Football Initiative (CFI) meeting. The mission of this group was to "promote the creation of a Division 1 college football program at Charlotte," eventually employing methods such as a promotional website, merchandise sales and a pledge campaign. A student organization, Charlotte Football Advocates (later CFI Students), became a part of the larger CFI group during the fall of 2006. In February 2007, UNC Charlotte students voted overwhelmingly in favor of football in an official campus-wide vote and the UNC Charlotte Board of Trustees voted to authorize $150,000 to study adding 49ers Football, and establishing a Football Feasibility Committee to be headed by outgoing board president and prominent Charlotte businessman Mac Everett. The committee held several meetings throughout the summer of 2007, plus three public forums in the fall of 2007.

In December 2007, the Football Feasibility Committee voted unanimously to recommend the addition of 49ers football. In September 2008, a major student-led March to the Endzone rally was held on campus. On September 18, 2008, Chancellor Dubois officially recommended adding a 49ers football program with the condition that its fans first raise $5 million to help fund the stadium complex. On November 13, 2008, the UNC Charlotte Board of Trustees voted to add a Charlotte 49ers football program by 2013.

Chancellor Dubois originally recommended that the university start Division I football at the FCS (formerly Division I-AA) level with no timeline to move up to FBS. The team played their first full season in the fall of 2013 as an FCS Independent. On May 4, 2012 Charlotte agreed to rejoin Conference USA for all sports except football in 2013, with football joining in 2015 (the first year the 49ers would be eligible due to the NCAA requirement that start-up programs play a minimum of two years in FCS). Charlotte moved to the FBS in 2015 and became FBS bowl eligible in 2016. The 49ers were founding members of C-USA from 1996 to 2005, but they did not compete in football during that time period.  Other schools to join C-USA with Charlotte include  Florida Atlantic University, Florida International University, Louisiana Tech University, University of Texas at San Antonio, University of North Texas, and Old Dominion University.

Brad Lambert era (2013–2018)

On March 1, 2011 the 49ers introduced Wake Forest defensive coordinator Brad Lambert as the program's first head coach.

The 49ers played as an Independent during their two years in the FCS subdivision. Charlotte Football officially joined the FBS subdivision and C-USA Football on July 1, 2015.

On November 18, 2018, Charlotte Athletics Director Mike Hill announced that after 8 years and 6 seasons as head coach, Lambert would not be retained following the season. Lambert had compiled a record of 22–48 during his tenure, including the program's first win in the inaugural game and winning the program's first FBS game. Lambert would finish his career at Charlotte a week later with a season-ending road victory against the previous season conference champion FAU.

Will Healy era (2018–2022)
On December 5, 2018 Austin Peay's Will Healy was announced as the Charlotte 49ers second head football coach. The 2017 Eddie Robinson Award by STATS for FCS Coach of the Year, had a 8-1 FCS record and a 7–1 record in the Ohio Valley Conference in his second season with the Governors, who previously had a 1–46 record before Healy took over the previous season.

On August 29, 2019, Healy recorded his first win as the head coach of Charlotte in a 49–28 victory against Gardner–Webb. On September 14, he recorded his first career victory over a Football Bowl Subdivision (FBS) opponent with a 52–17 win against UMass. Healy would record his first C-USA win against North Texas on October 26. Healy and the 49ers both would reach bowl eligibility for the first time following a home victory over Marshall November 23 in his first season at the helm. Then on September 3, 2021 in his third season, he would lead the 49ers to their first ever win over a Power Five opponent with a score of 31-28 against Duke at home.

Charlotte fired Healy on October 23, 2022, after a 1–7 start to the season. Pete Rossomando was named interim head coach for the final four games of the season.

Francis "Biff" Poggi era (2022–Present)

News was released on November 15, 2022 that Michigan associate head coach Francis "Biff" Poggi was named Charlotte's third head coach in the modern era.

Conference affiliations
 Independent (1946–1948)
 No team (1949–2012) 
 FCS Independent (2013–2014)
 Conference USA (2015–2023)
 American (2023)

Bowl games
Charlotte has participated in one bowl game, and has a record of 0–1.

NFL Draft Picks
Charlotte has had 4 players selected in the NFL Draft as of the 2020 Draft.

Additionally, Brandon Banks signed with the Washington Redskins and recorded one career tackle, and Austin Duke signed with the Carolina Panthers, as an undrafted free agent in 2017.
Benny Lemay signed with the Indianapolis Colts as an undrafted free agent in 2020. Ben Deluca signed as an undrafted free agent in 2021 with the Chargers and participated in 3 games

Head coaches 

(*) Interim head coach

Homecoming History 
Since coming back as a program in 2013, the 49ers have had a Homecoming Game, generally held in the middle of the season. They have a 3–6 program record on Homecoming.

All-time record 

Official record (including any NCAA imposed vacates and forfeits) against all current In-State NCAA Division I opponents.

vs. In-State NCAA Division I teams

(*)FCS Opponent
(°)AAC Conference Opponent

vs. C-USA teams

(*)Division Opponent

vs. AAC teams

(*)Annual rival game,
(°)Non-conference game

Forty Niner Seat Licenses
To generate financial support for the launch of the football program, Chancellor Dubois created a program called Forty Niner Seat Licenses, or FSLs, which essentially served as seat deposits for season tickets. The Chancellor initially set forth a goal of 5,000 FSL reservations within 6 months. However, due to the tremendous level of support for the new program, the goal was met in only 2 months.

In February 2008, a fundraising capital campaign was established and led by prominent community leaders. These leaders included Mac Everett, Johnny Harris and Gene Johnson. Additionally, three other UNC Charlotte alumni were introduced as executive chairs: David Hauser, chief financial officer for Duke Energy Corporation; Bob Hull, chief financial officer for Lowe's Companies, Inc.; and Joe Price, chief financial officer for Bank of America Corporation.

Seat licenses are being sold in three tiers of seating: Green, Gold and White Gold. Green seat licenses are being sold at $1,000 per seat and will be located between the 30 yard line and the end zone;  Gold seat licenses at $2,500 per seat and will be located between the 30 yard lines; and White Gold seat licenses at an undisclosed amount in a block of exclusive seating. Seat locations will be determined by the ticket holders' Charlotte 49ers Athletics Foundation rank which is determined by the amount of the cumulative financial contribution the donor has made to the Foundation.

Stadium

Chancellor Dubois conducted a lengthy review process of the committee's results before making his final recommendation to the Board of Trustees. He presented the findings of his own internal review to the board at a June meeting which included estimates from stadium design firm Populous. The estimates significantly increased facilities construction numbers from the feasibility committee figures. They were also significantly higher than those for a much larger facility recently constructed for the University of Central Florida's Bright House Stadium.

On February 12, 2010, the University of North Carolina Board of Governors approved a debt service fee increase to fund the construction of the football stadium and football center, and on August 2, 2010 Governor Bev Perdue signed the debt service fee bill into law to clear the way for stadium construction. Designed by the architecture teams of Jenkins-Peer Architects and the DLR Group, its location was shown near the campus entrance at Highway 29 north of Hayes Stadium. On April 28, 2011 Charlotte held a groundbreaking ceremony for the football stadium. The stadium was completed in summer 2012. The 49ers' first game was a 52–7 win over Campbell on August 31, 2013.

Future non-conference opponents 
Announced schedules as of November 21, 2022.

Attendance

The largest crowd for a Charlotte football game at Jerry Richardson Stadium is 19,151, which was achieved on September 8, 2018, against Appalachian State University. The previous record was 18,651, set in the season home opener in 2017.

Single Game Attendance

Attendance by season

Note:

† 2020 season attendance figures were affected by state and university quarantine decisions related to the COVID-19 pandemic. For specific details see the 2020 season page

References

External links

 

 
2013 establishments in North Carolina
American football teams established in 2013